Kansas City is a 1996 American crime film directed by Robert Altman, and starring Jennifer Jason Leigh, Miranda Richardson, Harry Belafonte, Michael Murphy and Steve Buscemi. The musical score of Kansas City is integrated into the film, with modern-day musicians recreating the Kansas City jazz of 1930s.

The film was entered into the 1996 Cannes Film Festival.

Plot
A kidnapping goes down in 1934 Kansas City. Blondie O'Hara's (Leigh) petty thief husband Johnny is taken by gangster "Seldom Seen" and held prisoner at the Hey Hey Club, one of the hot spots of the Kansas City jazz scene. Blondie herself kidnaps the wife of a local politician, Mrs. Stilton, who is addicted to laudanum (an opium liquid) and has secrets of her own. Blondie's plan is to blackmail Mr. Stilton into helping to free Johnny.

Despite the risk to his re-election campaign, Mr. Stilton does everything he can in order to free his wife by saving Johnny, including using his connections to the Tom Pendergast political machine. Meanwhile, Mrs. Stilton comes to befriend Blondie. She is impressed by Blondie's devotion to her husband, contrasted to her own loveless marriage.

A subplot concerns political fixer Johnny Flynn (Buscemi) paying vagrants and addicts to vote in the upcoming election and sway the outcome.

Cast

Reception
Kansas City received mixed reviews from critics, as it holds a 59% rating on Rotten Tomatoes based on 41 reviews.

Roger Ebert gave it three stars for Altman's "originality and invention", saying the story is "fairly thin" but "Altman gathered some of the best living jazz musicians, put them on a set representing the Hey Hey Club, and asked them to play period material in the style of the Kansas City jazz giants (Count Basie, Coleman Hawkins, Jay McShann, Lester Young, etc.). He filmed their work in a concert documentary style, and intercuts it". He praised the period recreation of colors and looks of the clothes, cars, and advertising and was reminded of Altman's other 1930s gangster movie, Thieves Like Us (1974).
Harry Belafonte won the New York Film Critics Award for Best Supporting Actor.

Soundtrack

The soundtrack was produced by Hal Willner and Steven Bernstein and featured several contemporary musicians playing the roles of jazz musicians from the 1930s. For example, Joshua Redman plays the role of Lester Young, Craig Handy plays Coleman Hawkins, Geri Allen plays Mary Lou Williams, and James Carter plays Ben Webster.

Track listing

Charts

References

External links
 
 
 

1996 films
1996 drama films
1990s crime drama films
American crime drama films
Films directed by Robert Altman
Jazz films
Films about gambling
Films set in Kansas City, Missouri
Films shot in Kansas
Films set in Missouri
Films shot in Missouri
Films set in the 1930s
1990s English-language films
1990s American films